Neilonellidae is a taxonomic family of small saltwater clams, marine bivalve molluscs in the order Nuculanida.

Genera and species
Genera and species within the family Neilonellidae include:
 Neilo
 Neilonella Dall, 1881
 Neilonella acinula (Dall, 1890)
 Neilonella corpulenta (Dall, 1881)
 Neilonella menziesi A. H. Clarke, 1959
 Neilonella quadrangularis (Dall, 1881)
 Neilonella subovata (A. E. Verrill & Bush, 1897)
 Neilonella whoii Allen & Sanders, 1996
 Pseudotindaria
 Pseudotindaria championi (Clarke, 1961)

References

 
Bivalve families